This article lists queens, countesses, and duchesses consort of the Kingdom, County, Duchy of Provence.

Queen of Provence 
See: List of Frankish queens and List of Burgundian queens.
After the division of the Carolingian Empire by the Treaty of Verdun (843), the first of the fraternal rulers of the three kingdoms to die was Lothair I, who divided his middle kingdom in accordance with the custom of the Franks between his three sons. Out of this division came the Kingdom of Provence, given to Lothair's youngest son, Charles. A heritage of royal rule was thus inaugurated in Provence that, though it was often subsumed into one of its larger neighbouring kingdoms, it was just as often proclaiming its own sovereigns.

Carolingian Dynasty, 855–879

Bosonid Dynasty, 879–933 

In 933, Provence ceases to be a separate kingdom as Hugh exchanged it with Rudolph II of Upper Burgundy for the Iron Crown of Lombardy, that is, rule of Italy.

Welf Dynasty, 888–1032 

{| width=95% class="wikitable"
!width = "8%" | Picture
!width = "10%" | Name 
!width = "9%" | Father
!width = "10%" | Birth
!width = "9%" | Marriage
!width = "9%" | Became Queen
!width = "9%" | Ceased to be Queen
!width = "9%" | Death
!width = "6%" | Spouse
|-
|align="center"| 
|align="center"| Bertha of Swabia
|align="center"| Burchard II, Duke of Swabia(Hunfridings)
|align="center"| 907 
|align="center"| 922
|align="center"| 933husband's accession
|align="center"| 11 July 937husband's death|align="center"| after 2 January 966
|align="center"| Rudolph I
|-
|align="center"| 
|align="center"| Adelane
|align="center"| -
|align="center"| 935/40
|align="center" colspan="2"| 950s?
|align="center" colspan="2"| 23 March 963/4
|align="center" rowspan="3"| Conrad III
|-
|align="center"| 
|align="center"| Matilda of France
|align="center"| Louis IV of France(Carolingian)
|align="center"| 943
|align="center" colspan="2"| 964
|align="center" colspan="2"| 26/27 January 981/2
|-
|align="center"|
|align="center"| Aldiud
|align="center"| -
|align="center"| -
|align="center" colspan="2"| after 981/2
|align="center"| 19 October 993husband's death|align="center"| -
|-
|align="center"| 
|align="center"| Agaltrudis
|align="center"| -
|align="center"| -
|align="center" colspan="2"| before 12 January 994 
|align="center" colspan="2"| 21 March 1008or18 February 1011
|align="center" rowspan="2"| Rudolph II
|-
|align="center"| 
|align="center"| Ermengarde of Savoy
|align="center"| Humbert I, Count of Savoy(Savoy)
|align="center"| -
|align="center" colspan="2"| 24 April/28 July 1011 
|align="center"| 6 September 1032husband's death|align="center"| 25/27 August 1057
|-
|}

In 1032 the kingdom of Burgundy and Provence was incorporated into the Holy Roman Empire as a third kingdom, the Kingdom of Burgundy (later also known as Kingdom of Arles), with the King of Germany or Emperor as King of Burgundy.

 Countess of Provence 

 House of Provence, 961–1127 

 House of Barcelona, 1127–1267 

 Capetian House of Anjou, 1267–1382 

 House of Valois-Anjou, 1382–1481 

 Courtesy title 

 Margravine of Provence See: List of Toulousain consorts.''

Notes

Sources 
 PROVENCE

 
 
Provence
Provence
Provence, List of royal consorts of